Ketapangia is a genus of moths in the family Gracillariidae.

Species
Ketapangia leucochorda  (Meyrick, 1908) 
Ketapangia regulifera  (Meyrick, 1933)

References

External links
Global Taxonomic Database of Gracillariidae (Lepidoptera)

Gracillariinae
Gracillarioidea genera